Statistics of Swedish football Division 3 for the 1996 season.

League standings

Norra Norrland 1996

Mellersta Norrland 1996

Södra Norrland 1996

Norra Svealand 1996

Östra Svealand 1996

Västra Svealand 1996

Nordöstra Götaland 1996

Nordvästra Götaland 1996

Mellersta Götaland 1996

Sydöstra Götaland 1996

Sydvästra Götaland 1996

Södra Götaland 1996

Footnotes

References 

Swedish Football Division 3 seasons
4
Sweden
Sweden